Refuge Pe. Balduino Rambo was a Brazilian Antarctic summer installation named after the botanist Father Balduíno Rambo. Located on King George Island, South Shetland Islands, Antarctica, it depended both logistically and administratively on Comandante Ferraz; it was dismantled in 2004.

Established in the summer of 1985, it could accommodate up to 6 scientists for up to 40 days.

See also
 List of Antarctic research stations
 List of Antarctic field camps
 Brazilian Antarctic Program

References

Brazilian Antarctica
Outposts of the South Shetland Islands
Outposts of Antarctica
1985 establishments in Antarctica
2004 disestablishments in Antarctica